Andrea Shaw (born December 18, 1983) is an American professional bodybuilding champion and physique and figure competitor. She holds three Ms. Olympia title wins and three Ms Rising Phoenix title wins.

Early life
Andrea grew up in Detroit, Michigan. As a girl growing up, she was into gymnastics and competitive cheerleading. At Benjamin Nolan Middle School, in eighth-grade aerobics class, her teacher taught her to make her own structures within the middle school which didn't offer adequate equipment or much organized sports. At the age of 13, she saw Lenda Murray for the first time due to her mom working out at the same gym, Powerhouse Gym in Center Line, Michigan, that Lenda worked out at. At the time, she never thought she would be good enough to compete in female bodybuilding. After middle school, she was burnt out from gymnastics and cheerleading, so she got into academics in high school. After gaining some extra weight, her mother, a nurse and former personal trainer, encouraged her athletic ambitions by getting her to start working out at the Powerhouse Gym in Centerline, Michigan. After the age of 15, she began attending the gym on her own. Her mother's training partner was a female bodybuilder and began giving her advice on muscle building exercises when she was 17 years old. She said she had no desire to be a bodybuilder back then, instead wanting to be a fashion model, but was not tall enough.

Figure career
At the age of 18, Andrea's training adviser told her mom she didn't think she had the heart to stick with training. This encouraged her to focus on obtaining great shape. While training one day at Powerhouse Gym, she came across an Oxygen Magazine and saw the magazine was full of athletic fitness and sports models. She decided that would be her ambition. However, her body began responding quickly to resistance training and once she started intense weight training, soon people were asking her if she competed in muscle competitions. She didn't see herself as having enough size and development to compete as a bodybuilder, but liked the way the figure competitors looked in the magazines. In 2008, she entered two figure competitions, placing 3rd and 4th, but she didn't feel she was on the right path. She took 8 years off from competing.

During this time, Andrea attended Wayne State University, where she began studies during freshmen year in the exercise science program. She earned a BA in exercise and sports science, along with continuing to refine her resistance training. In her academic pursuit, she said she neglected her physical health and gained about 20 pounds that year. To address her physical health, she took small steps to exercise and diet. She also started lifting heavier and found she put on size easily. Instead of cutting food from her diet, she said she made substitutions, like baked chips in place of regular chips, and spinach wraps rather than regular bread. She began to research bodybuilding. She took an eight-year break after college to continue her bodybuilding studies. She interned at the Detroit Medical Center, worked in the physical therapy department at Beaumont and received her group training and personal training certificates.

Competition history
 2008 Karen Zaremba Classic – 3rd
 2008 Michigan Natural Championships – 4th

Physique career

Amateur
Over the next eight years, Andrea took a break from competing, instead focusing on studying and researching exercises, obtaining a new trainer, and subscribing to magazines such as Oxygen Mag, Muscle & Fitness Hers, Shape, and Muscular Development. She changed her major and found a program that specifically address experience and sports science. In 2016, she decided to resume competing and switched to physique. After competing in six competitions, she placed 2nd at the 2018 Nationals, qualifying herself for an IFBB pro card. She went on to attend the 2019 Toronto Pro, placing 11th.

Professional

Competition history
 2016 John Simmons Championships – 4th
 2018 Ohio Natural Championship – 2nd
 2018 John Simmons Championship – 1st
 2018 Lenda Murray Detroit Classic – 1st
 2018 North Americans – 3rd
 2018 Nationals – 2nd
 2019 IFBB Tornoto Pro Supershow – 11th

Bodybuilding career

At the 2019 Toronto Pro, Andrea spoke to one of the judges, along with female bodybuilders Irene Andersen, Margaret Marvelous, Lenda Murray, and Alina Popa who all told her she looked more like a bodybuilder than a physique competitor and she ought to consider switching divisions. Shortly, thereafter, Andrea competed at the 2019 Chicago Pro as a bodybuilder, placing second to Aleesha Young by 1 point. She trains at Powerhouse Gym in Highland Park, Michigan, and is coached by her longtime boyfriend, former IFBB Pro John Simmons. Simmons is 24 years her senior. She progressed from working out three days a week to every day. She spends eight to 14 hours working out weekly and once a week she has a cheat meal to celebrate a successful week. She has made guest appearances at bodybuilding competitions, model for women’s clothing lines and traveled to Germany to hold training events together with Mamdouh Elssbiay, the 2020 Mr. Olympia title winner. Andrea appeared on Scott McNally's podcast, "It's Only Bodybuilding," on June 29, 2022, and defended her use of PEDs.  During the 2022 Rising Phoenix, she admitted in her routine video that she "woke up" in an ICU in a Detroit hospital on January 21, 2022, and was treated several days for a blood disorder deficiency attributed from her anabolic drug use.

Competition history
 2019 IFBB Professional League (IFBB) Wings of Strength (WOS) Chicago Pro Women's Bodybuilding - 2nd
 2019 IFBB WOS Rising Phoenix Women's Bodybuilding World Championship - 7th
 2020 IFBB Omaha Pro Women's Bodybuilding - 1st
 2020 Tim Gardner Productions (TGP) IFBB WOS Rising Phoenix Women’s Bodybuilding World Championships - 1st
 2020 Ms. Olympia - 1st
 2021 TGP IFBB WOS Rising Phoenix Women’s Bodybuilding World Championships - 1st
 2021 Ms. Olympia - 1st
 2022 IFBB Bikini Lab Hawaii Rising Phoenix Women’s Bodybuilding World Championship - 1st
 2022 Ms. Olympia - 1st

Personal life
Andrea lives in Clinton Township, Michigan. She is a personal trainer and has plans to go back to school, hoping to one day obtain a doctorate.

References

External links
 Andrea Shaw Instagram

1983 births
Living people
African-American female bodybuilders
African-American Christians
African-American Jews
Fitness and figure competitors
Professional bodybuilders
Sportspeople from Michigan
21st-century African-American sportspeople
20th-century African-American people
20th-century African-American women
21st-century African-American women